Razdrto is name of several villages in Slovenia:

 Razdrto, Postojna
 Razdrto, Šentjernej